is a Japanese animation series written and illustrated by Kurose, and published by Comico Japan. An original net anime adaptation by Satelight was released on the Comico app from December 2015 to February 2016. A television broadcast of the anime began on July 1, 2016 on Tokyo MX.

Plot
Yuki Kurihara is a teenage girl in high school who has been granted her wish of dating her longtime crush Shinya Momotsuki. At first she appears to look and act like an adorable young lady, but in reality she is a crazed maniac over "Momo". Shinya on the other hand, has had no experience in romantic relationships or anything that has to do with sex but mostly he just wants to make Yuki, himself, and all of their friends happy. As the story progresses, Shinya eventually falls for Yuki and thinks she's very cute.

Characters

 
 Shinya is referred to as "cute" by many girls and even boys. He was confessed to by a girl called Yuki Kurihara and began dating her. At first he is unaware of the way Yuki had been stalking him and taking countless secret photos of him. He eventually hears from her about how she collects the things he touches, though he doesn't know that she's kept all his used straws. He's childhood friends with Rihito, Shōta and Yuzuki, and frequently hangs out with the former two, though they very much enjoy teasing him about how small and "cute" he is. Eventually, as the story progresses, he confessed to Yuki that he also likes her. He is shown to be jealous whenever he is not Yuki's priority.

Yuki is a young high school girl in her second year who confessed to Shinya Momotsuki. Kurihara has a strange stalker-like habit of knowing practically all of Shinya's hobbies, interests, tastes in things such as food, and school schedule. She also likes to hide in places where no one will see her taking pictures of him. Although, even though her actions are quite suspicious and should have been definitely noticed by her own boyfriend, Momotsuki seems to have never come across the thought of her being the type who would stalk their own partner. He also never seems to notice when Kurihara is performing such actions, such as when she blatantly took a photo of him near the bus stop, until Yuki admits her habits to her boyfriend during a trip to the hot springs.

Yuki's best friend. She frequently worries about Yuki's obsessive stalking and other behaviors, and tries to help her in her relationship when possible. She has a sharp tongue and a poker face. She plays the piano and accompanies the school choir in competitions.

Momotsuki, Yuzuki and Shōta's childhood friend. A very cool and casual type, he is Yuzuki's secret crush. His feelings toward Yuzuki are not entirely clear at first, but eventually it's revealed that he's in love with her. However, he rejects her on account of Shouta's feelings, as well as the fact that her feelings toward Shouta are so very strong and her "dependence" on him so strong that there would be "no meaning" to her loving him. Despite this, he has expressed hope that someday he'd be able to make her look more completely his way.

Momotsuki, Rihito and Yuzuki's childhood friend, as well as Yuzuki's cousin. He and Yuzuki have been together since they were babies, and he is always there for her. In early elementary school, when Yuzuki was trying to get closer to Rihito, he saw her kiss his cheek; he realized at that moment that Yuzuki had feelings for Rihito, that Rihito had feelings for her, and that he too had feelings for her. He's been in love with Yuzuki ever since, but she has never noticed and even taken his presence for granted due to their being related.

Momotsuki's classmate. She secretly has a crush on him and often worries about Yuki's behavior and relationship with him. She is exceptionally tall and is at times compared to a "pretty boy" type, and as a result, is quite popular among the girls. She is best friends with Ikue and Yuzuki.

Yuzuki is Momo's friend.
Shōta's cousin and childhood friend to Shōta, Momotsuki, and Rihito. She secretly has a crush on Rihito, and is completely unaware of Shōta's crush on her; when pressed in chapter 113 she reveals that she does care more about Shōta, and he is always number one in her thoughts, but she never thought of the possibility of romance; since they're cousins, she figured it was only natural that they'd always be together. She used to always refer to herself as "Yuu-chan" in an attempt to cling to the past, but after she confesses her love to Rihito and is rejected, she decides to "graduate" from this.

Ikue's older brother, reluctantly nicknamed "Pyon-kun". He is extremely overprotective of his sister and has demonstrated some excessive interest in her and her friends. Yuki uses this to her advantage, bribing him with pictures of his sister and her friends in exchange for info on Momo's schedule.

Momotsuki's classmate and Rio and Yuzuki's best friend.

Rihito's older brother. A medical student, he has rather poor luck with women. He tends to try to be flirtatious with the girls around him but appears to have had little luck.

The overenthusiastic president of the newspaper club.

Yuki's classmate. He is always struck down with a cold whenever mentioned in the story.

 

A new first-year student during Shinya's second year of high school. A short girl with purple hair and a beauty mark. She admires Rio and initially mistook her as a boy. Even after the misunderstanding is resolved, she asks Yuki to give her candid photos of Rio dressing up as a vampire during a choir festival in the previous year.

A new first-year student during Shinya's second year of high school. A tall boy with a shy temperament. He is close friends with Hinano.

Shinya's father who is a photographer. Busy with work, he usually comes home around midnight. He has a highly androgynous appearance such that Yuki initially mistook him as Shinya's mother instead.

Shinya's cousin who is in third grade. He works as a child model for a magazine of which his mother is an editor. Just like Shinya's father, he is also mistaken as a girl by Yuki. Initially hostile towards Yuki for believing that she was "stealing" his beloved cousin away from him, he eventually opened up to her after getting lost in a shopping mall.

Media

Manga

Volume list

Anime
The original net animation series is directed by Yoshimasa Hiraike, featuring animation by Satelight, character designs by Miwa Oshima and music by To-Mas Soundsight Fluorescent Forest (consisting of members Masumi Itō, Mito and Yohei Matsui). Hiraike had also written the scripts alongside Mariko Mochizuki and Tomoko Shinozuka. The opening theme is performed by Ai Kakuma and Nobuhiko Okamoto while the ending theme is performed by Kentarou Tsubone. The anime ran from December 25, 2015 to February 4, 2016 on the Comico app. A television broadcast of the series on Tokyo MX began on July 1, 2016. The series has been licensed for North America by Sentai Filmworks.

Episode list

References

External links
  
 

2015 anime ONAs
Anime series based on manga
Comedy anime and manga
Japanese webtoons
Satelight
Seinen manga
Sentai Filmworks
Webtoons in print